Dubrovka is a rural locality (a village) in Butylitskoye Rural Settlement, Melenkovsky District, Vladimir Oblast, Russia. The population was 24 as of 2010.

Geography 
Dubrovka is located 24 km north of Melenki (the district's administrative centre) by road. Butylitsy is the nearest rural locality.

References 

Rural localities in Melenkovsky District
Melenkovsky Uyezd